Yaiskul Legislative Assembly constituency is one of the 60 Legislative Assembly constituencies of Manipur state in India.

It is part of Imphal East district.

Members of the Legislative Assembly 
Source:

Election results

2017

See also
 List of constituencies of the Manipur Legislative Assembly
 Imphal East district

References

External links
 

Imphal East district
Assembly constituencies of Manipur